Margarita Villaescusa Rojo (born 14 October 1964) is a Mexican politician affiliated with the PRI. As of 2013 she served as Senator of the LXI Legislature of the Mexican Congress representing Sinaloa as replacement of Mario López Valdez.

References

1964 births
Living people
Politicians from Sinaloa
People from Culiacán
Women members of the Senate of the Republic (Mexico)
Members of the Senate of the Republic (Mexico)
Institutional Revolutionary Party politicians
21st-century Mexican politicians
21st-century Mexican women politicians